‌
Ours de Villard-de-Lans (Villard-de-Lans Bears) is a French ice hockey team based in Villard-de-Lans playing in the FFHG Division 2.

The team was founded in 1931 and plays home games at the Patinoire municipale de Villard-de-Lans.

Former players
 Aurélien Chabot
 César Lefranc
 Yann Marez
 Clément Masson
 Pierre-Antoine Simonneau

Notable players
Derek Haas
Guy Dupuis
Corrado Micalef
Jeff Lerg

Trophies and awards
 Ligue Magnus (French Championship):
  (x5)   1962, 1967, 1968, 1975, 1978
 French Cup: 
  (x2) 1977, 2003

External links
 Official website 

Ice hockey teams in France
Sport in Isère
Ice hockey clubs established in 1931
1931 establishments in France